TrueVisions is a cable and satellite television operator in Thailand. TrueVisions is owned by the True Corporation. Until February 2007, it was called the United Broadcasting Corporation (UBC), or UBC-True.

History

International Broadcasting Corporation (1989  1998)

In 1989, the International Broadcasting Corporation (IBC) was established by Thaksin Shinawatra. It was the first national cable TV provider. The MCOT gave the IBC a twenty year concession to a provide subscription television service. The IBC broadcast its programmes via super high frequency microwaves using MMDS.

In 1995, after approval for an expansion of coverage area, the IBC began its first DTH service. In 1997, the South AfricanDutch company, MIH Limited, bought a sixteen percent stake in the IBC. The IBC obtained most program content from the channels of other countries including HBO, CNN and ESPN.

UTV Cable Network (1993  1998) 

In September 1995, UTV began a CATV service in the Bangkok metropolitan area. The service was provided on a hybrid fiber coaxial network. The cable technology allowed a number of channels to be offered with high quality sound and pictures. It also provided a pay-per-view option. By 1997, the hybrid fiber coaxial cable network reached about 800,000 homes. In 1997, UTV sold the cable infrastructure component of its business to its sister company, Asia Multimedia Company Limited. This allowed UTV to focus on content and service delivery to subscribers.

Merger with United Broadcasting Corporation (1998  2006)
In February 1998, after the onset of the 1997 Asian financial crisis, the IBC merged with UTV in order to decrease operational costs. The United Broadcasting Corporation (UBC) was formed. The UBC later split into two companies: UBC plc. which provided a pay-television service via the IBC's satellite transmission concession, and UBC Cable Co., Ltd. which provided a pay-television service via UTV's cable concession.

UBC-True (2006  2007)
In November 2005, True Corporation (True) bought a 30.59 percent stake in UBC from MIH Holdings. It launched a tender offer for the 221 million shares outstanding at 26.5 baht per share and delisted UBC from the Stock Exchange of Thailand (SET).

In April 2006, UBC rebranded to "UBC-True". UBC was delisted from SET on April 11, 2006.

On April 2, 2006, UBC-True announced that it would launch the documentary channels Explore 1, Explore 2, and Explore 3 in October 2006. UBC-True also announced the launch of entertainment channels, G-Square and UBC Preview, followed by two music channels, Majung TV and True Music.

TrueVisions (2007  present)
On January 24, 2007, UBC-True was re-branded as "TrueVisions" (TrueVisions UBC). It announced its purchase of exclusive rights to the Premier League.

On July 12, 2012, after a long battle about Copyright infringement (piracy), TrueVisions switched its content encryption system to VideoGuard. It also upgraded its video encryption from MPEG-2 to MPEG-4. This was used with the new HD set-top box launched in October 2011.

In 2012, TrueVisions lost its bid for the 2013  2016 Premier League broadcast rights to a new company, CTH. In 2016, TrueVisions restored the Premier League contents through beIN Sports, the Qatar based sports network. After negotiations, TrueVisions aired 6 beIN sports channels.

However, in 2019 TrueVisions won the rights to broadcast the Premier League in Thailand for 3 seasons, from 2019/2020-2021/2022.

Number of subscribers
At the end of the 2008 financial year, TrueVisions had 799,837 subscribers (1,469,000 subscribers including FreeView). The table below, charts the annual growth of TrueVisions' subscriber base (excluding TrueLife FreeView):

Products

Personal Video Recording System
In July 2008, TrueVisions launched its PVR (Personal-Digital Video Recording) system. The TrueVisions PVR set-top box included a 140 GB hard drive for recording. It was sold separately with an extra monthly fee.

HD set-top box
In October 2011, TrueVisions launched an HD descrambler and all-in-one set-top box called "HD Plus" following the launch of its HDTV service. The HD Plus was manufactured by Samsung and Humax. HD Plus also has the PVR feature which recorded using an external eSATA hard drive. On September 22, 2014, the extra monthly fee for PVR was removed for customers with premium packages.

High-definition channels
In November 2007, TrueVisions started testing its high definition (HD) broadcasts and its new HD PVR set-top box. The system was also demonstrated at the Bangkok ICT Expo. In 2010, TrueVisions offered customers with premium subscriptions three HD channels (HBO and two sports channels) for an extra payment. The original HD set-top box did not have a DVR function. In 2011, TrueVisions offered CATV customer eight new HD channels, and a new combined HD and PVR set-top box. This coincided with extension of fibre optic cable networks to some provincial areas.
On July 16, 2012, TrueVisions expanded their HD offerings to seventeen channels, making all HD channels available to both DSTV and CATV subscribers. In September 2016, TrueVisions offered fifty-six HD channels.

3D broadcasts
In 2008, TrueVisions tested 3D broadcasts, showing short European-made vignettes filmed using the Pulfrich effect. In 2009, segments of Academy Fantasia were broadcast live using the Pulfrich effect. Since 2013, the True Film HD channel has aired selected movies in a Side-By-Side 3D format.

4K UHD
On May 18, 2018, TrueVisions announced it will broadcast most of the 2018 FIFA World Cup live matches in UHD on a new dedicated 4K channel.

TrueID TV
The "TrueID TV" service offers more viewing options. Customers can view their subscribed channels (but not all channels) on any mobile device. Functions include "on demand" and "picture quality".

See also
 List of television stations in Thailand#TrueVisions channels
 Media of Thailand

References

External links

Cable television companies
Charoen Pokphand
True Corporation
Companies based in Bangkok
Mass media companies of Thailand
Television in Thailand